The Morane-Saulnier AC, also known as Morane-Saulnier Type AC and MoS 23, was a French fighter of the 1910s.

Development 
The AC was conceived in mid-1916, being derived from the Type N via the unbuilt Type U. It differed from earlier single-seat Morane-Saulnier aircraft in that it had ailerons for lateral control rather than wing warping, and because of its rigid wing bracing, with a wire braced truss of steel tubes supporting the wings from below.  It appeared in autumn of that year, and was found to be aerodynamically clean.

Operational history 
The AC's first flight is unrecorded, however it is assumed that it was late summer 1916.  After initial testing thirty aircraft were ordered for the Aviation Militaire.  Although of advanced design and good performance, the AC was considered inferior to the SPAD S.VII and therefore was not adopted in quantity.  Two examples were provided to the Royal Flying Corps for evaluation.

Operators 
 
 Armée de l'Air
 
 Royal Flying Corps

Specifications

References

Notes

Bibliography

Further reading

1910s French fighter aircraft
AC
Rotary-engined aircraft
Single-engined tractor aircraft
Aircraft first flown in 1916